During 2005–2010, Kim has had two solo songs from SS501 albums: "Rize Up" from Kokoro, and "Please Be Nice To Me" from SS501 Solo Collection. In 2008, he released "Thank You" digital single, a theme song from We Got Married and was also included in SS501 mini album Find. In 2009, he contributed two soundtracks from Boys Over Flowers including the acoustic version of "Because I'm Stupid"" and "A Thing Called Happiness". He, then released a DVD entitled Goodbye Yoon Ji-hoo, marking the end of his character role in Boys Over Flowers, and coming back as the leader of SS501. In 2010, he contributed "One More Time" from his drama Playful Kiss. 

On June 7, 2011, Kim released his solo debut mini album, Break Down, exceeding 70,000 pre-ordered copies in just 10 days. It peaked at number one on Gaon Weekly Album Chart and was the best-selling album for June on Gaon Monthly Album Chart with 100,433 copies sold. It also topped the Japanese Oricon chart in the International Imported Album category and was a certified platinum in Taiwan, due to which Warner Music Taiwan CEO Chen Ze Shan handed Kim a platinum record in a press conference held in Taiwan. "Break Down" was the first-place winner for two consecutive weeks on Mnet's M! Countdown music show as well as on KBS's Music Bank. His second mini album Lucky debuted at number 5 on Billboard's World Chart and topped the Gaon Chart again, garnering the highest selling album on the Hanteo Album Sales Chart for the month of October.

On January 25, 2012, Kim released his first Japanese single "Kiss Kiss / Lucky Guy", which consists of Japanese versions of songs from his two Korean mini albums and one original Japanese song. Both singles reached the highest record in a day for any overseas artist in Japan. Two weeks after its release, the single reached its Gold status in Japan for selling 121,547 copies. His First Impact Concert DVD sold 16,000 copies in its first week of release, taking the number one spot for the Overall DVD Chart. This is the first time a Korean artist has taken the number one spot, and a second time a foreign artist has taken the number one spot on the charts. Two months after the DVD release, Kim released his second Japanese single "Heat" on July 4. The single took over Japan Oricon's Daily and Weekly Charts, with 140,000 copies sold on its first day and a total of 183,000 copies for its first week. The album also placed third for Oricon singles monthly chart for the month of July, selling 196,850 copies and beating DBSK's Android album with 171,554 copies. Ultimately, Kim received a Gold certificate again for his "Heat" single. His first full length Japanese album entitled Unlimited topped the Oricon Daily Album Charts, and both the Tower Records' Weekly Album Charts for Shibuya branch and overall Weekly Album Chart upon its release. The album has been certified Gold by the Recording Industry Association of Japan (RIAJ) after selling more than 100,000 units to retailers.

His third Japanese singleTonight topped the Oricon Daily charts with 101,818 copies sold, and taking the number two spot by the end of the week. The album received Gold certificate for selling more than one million copies on June. On the other hand, his third Korean mini album Round 3 topped Gaon Weekly Charts, Billboard World Album Charts Oricon Imported Album Charts, and iTunes Top Dance album charts in eight countries.

Studio albums

Extended plays

Singles

Soundtrack contributions

Videography

Music videos

Video albums

Songwriting credits

See also
 SS501 discography
 Heo Young-saeng discography
 Kim Kyu-jong discography
 Park Jung-min discography
 Kim Hyung-jun discography

Notes

References

External links
 
 
 
 
 
 

SS501
Discographies of South Korean artists
Pop music discographies